Meishan Township is a rural township in Chiayi County, Taiwan. It is located in the northeastern part of the county, bordering Yunlin County.

Geography
It has a population total of 18,164 and an area of 119.7571 km2.

Administrative divisions
Meitung, Meinan, Meibei, Guoshan, Zunnan, Zunbei, Shuangxi, Danan, Anjing, Yongxing, Bantian, Taiping, Taixing, Longyan, Bihu, Ruifeng, Ruili and Taihe Village.

Tourist attractions
 Meishan Park
 Taiping Sky Bridge
 Yuntan Waterfall
Taiping (太平) Scenic Area 
Rueifong (瑞峰) Scenic Area 
Taihe (太和) Scenic Area 
Rueili (瑞里) Scenic Area 
Shuangsi (雙溪) Grand Canyon
Bihu (碧湖) Farms Leisure park

Transportation

County Road 149
County Road 162
County Road 162甲 
County Road 169

Alishan Forest Railway
 Liyuanliao Station

References

External links

 Meishan Township

Townships in Chiayi County